Marianne Hoppe Grøndahl (1938–2012) was a Danish photographer. Trained in publicity and press photography, she worked in both the theatrical environment and as a documentary photographer, remembered for her images of Jordan.

Born in Stege, she started photographing at the age of 10. She trained as a publicity photographer in 1957. Her many photobooks present images of the Royal Danish Ballet and of the music and film environment. From 1980 to 1999, she documented the Odense Teater, Café Teatret, Folketeatret and the Royal Danish Theatre. Her last book, documenting the homeless citizens of Odense was published in 2011.

Selected books

Grøndahl, Marianne (2011). Udstødt. Gyldendal.

References

External links
Marianne Grøndahl's website

1938 births
2012 deaths
20th-century Danish photographers
21st-century Danish photographers
20th-century Danish women artists
20th-century Danish artists
20th-century women photographers
Danish photographers
Danish women photographers
People from Møn
21st-century women photographers